The Warrior Prophet: Muhammad and War  is a 2022 biographical book by British-New Zealand Islamic scholar Joel Hayward about the Islamic prophet Muhammad’s understanding of warfare and strategy.

Summary
Hayward has been noted for weaving "together classical Islamic knowledge and methodologies and the source-critical Western historical method to make innovative yet carefully reasoned sense of complex historical issues". The Warrior Prophet: Muhammad and War is his latest book to use this approach. The book eschews the traditional Islamic explanation that Muhammad excelled at warfare simply because he was a prophet and was therefore good at everything. Hayward argues that this incomplete explanation ignores Muhammad's agency and hides his human aptitude and brilliance. Muhammad, he argues, was himself an astute and skilled strategist and warrior who understood the necessity of warfare as well as its transformational power.  At 457 pages, it took Hayward "about a decade of on-and-off work to complete."

Reviews

Kirkis Reviews concludes that, "at more than 450 dense pages, the book may be overwhelming to those unfamiliar with Islamic history, though ample reading aids (from maps and charts to timelines and a glossary) are provided. With almost 1,500 endnotes, this is a remarkably well-researched book that has a solid grasp on both contemporary scholarship as well as Arabic primary sources."

A five-star BookViral review states: “Joel Hayward sets aside religious fervor and hearsay in his impeccably and intensively researched book, The Warrior Prophet: Muhammad and War. Rather than offering sentimentality and thinly veiled assumptions, it represents a comprehensive and evidence-based historical account of the Prophet Muhammad ... Hayward’s tireless study is evidenced in his superbly executed academic writing, as he brings together the threads of past documentation and artefacts, shaping his words into a fully rounded account. With the fascinating backdrop of customs, practices and beliefs of the peoples of that time period, Hayward brings the Prophet Muhammad to life, focusing on his motivations and movements as he wielded great strength and power throughout the east, fighting alongside his soldiers in his God-ordained role. ... Complete with comprehensive and extensive referencing, The warrior Prophet: Muhammad and War is unreservedly recommended as a historically accurate fully researched work detailing the life and times of the Prophet Muhammad.

Charlotte Walker of LoveReading wrote: "Referenced in detail and using extant sources, … it comes complete with chronology of the Prophet’s life, glossary, maps and a table of Islamic Raids and Campaigns to further help the reader get to grips with the subject . … The Warrior Prophet is an "engaging read for those interested in military history as well as those looking to expand their knowledge of Islam and the Prophet."

A five-star review in The Online Book Club described the book as "highly insightful and informative", with a detached and historical critical methodological approach that analyzed Muhammad within the context of seventh-century Arabia, and thus provided "in-depth knowledge and enlightenment."

In a five-star review, Philip Zozzaro of the Manhattan Book Review called The Warrior Prophet "convincing and thought-provoking" and stated that "Hayward contributes a well-researched and annotated study" that "doesn’t narrowly focus on wins and losses for Muhammad and his disciples but also delves into the guiding philosophies that Islam teaches. Hayward’s book will open the eyes of history devotees as well as those who are well-versed in the life of the esteemed prophet/leader."

See also
Prophetic biography
List of biographies of Muhammad

References 

2022 non-fiction books
English non-fiction books
Biographies of Muhammad
English-language books
Life of Muhammad
Books by Joel Hayward